Jacek Prześluga is a former General Director and a chairman of PKP Intercity S.A. He held this position for more than a year and left the job according to tensions with other PKP Intercity chairman, Mr. Czesław Warsewicz, who took the CEO position after him.

References 

Polish State Railways people
Living people
Year of birth missing (living people)